The Yamatai Honshu Theory is the theory that the Yamatai kingdom was located in Honshu, specifically Kinai, where the capital was located in the Kofun period rather than in Kyushu as the Yamatai Kyushu Theory proposes.

According to this theory, the Yamatai was essentially continuous with the Yamato Kingship, with its capital in roughly the same region, and the Yamatai transformed into the Yamato Kingship when the Kofun period began

Overview 

Arai Shiraishi, in his "Koshitong or Inquires," proposed the theory of Yamato Province. Later, however, in "Gaikoku no Jijo Chosho" (Foreign Affairs Chronicle), he proposed the theory of Yamato-gun in Chikugo Province. Since then, from the Edo period to the present, the mainstream of the academic world has been largely divided between the "" (Naito Konan et al.) and the "Kyushu Theory" (Shiratori Kokichi et al.). The Kyushu theory, however, is divided into two distinct theories: one that says the Yamataikoku "moved" (the "eastward shift" theory) and one that says it "did not move at all. The "eastward shift" theory holds that the Yamataikoku moved to the Kinai region and became the Yamato Kingdom.

It is assumed that the new royal capital, which was the capital of Japan, is Yamatai

In the 1960s, it was thought that artifacts from the period of the Yamataikoku were abundant in Kyushu while those from the Kinai region were scarce in the Kinai region. The National Institute for Radiocarbon Dating and Dendrochronology has presented a chronology based on radiocarbon dating and dendrochronology that compares the tombs of Himiko and the Yamato imperial court to those of Yamatai and Himiko, and that the establishment of the Yamato Imperial Court dates back to that time. Some have suggested that radiocarbon dating of pottery from the Kinai region by the National Institute of Japanese Archaeology and Dating suggests that the establishment of the early state in the Yamato region of the Kinai region dates back to the same period as the Yamataikoku.。. According to this Kinai theory, there was at least one power in 3rd century Japan that was able to secure transportation routes from Yamato to the continent, and it can be said that a power with great influence over the entire western Japan centering on Yamato, namely the "Yamato Kingdom," was already established at this time.

Makimuku ruins 
In 2011, a part of another large building was found about 5 meters to the east of the large building ruins, and the building ruins may have been built in the late 3rd century or later.。

Hashihaka Kofun 

The  is a megalithic tomb (kofun) located in Sakurai City, Nara Prefecture, Japan. The Hashihaka kofun is considered to be the first large keyhole-shaped kofun constructed in Japan and is associated with the emergence of the Yamato Kingship. It is sometimes considered the birthplace of the Kofun system of tombs which is highly linked to the emergence of a state level society.

See also 

 Yamatai
 Wajinden
 Makimuku ruins
 Hashihaka Kofun
 Yamatai Kyushu Theory

Annotations

References 

Hypotheses
Yamatai